Elizabeth Banks (born 1974) is an American actress and filmmaker.

Elizabeth Banks may also refer to:

Elizabeth Lindsay Banks (1849–1933), a British-Australian kindergarten teacher
Elizabeth Banks (journalist) (1872–1938), American journalist and author
Elizabeth Banks (architect) (born 1941), British landscape architect and first woman president of the Royal Horticultural Society
Lizzy Banks (born 1990), British cyclist